Breeze Creek is a stream in Tuolumne County, California, United States.

Breeze Creek was named for William F. Breeze for his assistance in creating a map of the area.

See also
List of rivers of California

References

Rivers of Tuolumne County, California
Rivers of Northern California